David Maldonado González (born 1 July 1967) is a Mexican politician from the National Action Party. From 2006 to 2009, he served as Deputy of the LX Legislature of the Mexican Congress representing Baja California.

References

1967 births
Living people
Politicians from Baja California
National Action Party (Mexico) politicians
21st-century Mexican politicians
Deputies of the LX Legislature of Mexico
Members of the Chamber of Deputies (Mexico) for Baja California
Autonomous University of Baja California alumni